The Let's Save Togo Collective (CST) is a political alliance in Togo.

History
The alliance was established in 2012, consists of the Alliance of Democrats for Integral Development (ADDI), National Alliance for Change (ANC), the Organisation to Build a United Togo, the Socialist Pact for Renewal, the Movement of Centrist Republicans and the Workers' Party In the 2013 parliamentary elections it received 29% of the vote, winning 19 of the 91 seats in the National Assembly. The ANC took 16 seats and the ADDI three.

Election results

Parliamentary election

See also
:Category:Let's Save Togo Collective politicians

References

Political party alliances in Togo
Political parties established in 2012
2012 establishments in Togo